Jimmy Jones Tchana (born August 14, 1984 in Paris, France), is a French footballer who plays for Békéscsaba 1912 Előre SE in the Hungarian Nemzeti Bajnokság II.

Career
Jimmy made his debut for Debreceni VSC in the Hungarian Borsodi Liga on February 23, 2007 in a 1-0 away win against Vasas SC as a sub, and scored his first goal for Debreceni in his first league match.

External links
Hlsz.hu játékosprofil

1984 births
Living people
Footballers from Paris
French footballers
French sportspeople of Cameroonian descent
Association football forwards
US Créteil-Lusitanos players
Kalamata F.C. players
Debreceni VSC players
FC Sopron players
Diósgyőri VTK players
Olympiacos Volos F.C. players
Kallithea F.C. players
Békéscsaba 1912 Előre footballers
Nemzeti Bajnokság I players
French expatriate footballers
Expatriate footballers in Greece
Expatriate footballers in Hungary
French expatriate sportspeople in Greece
French expatriate sportspeople in Hungary